Dillington may refer to:

Places in England 

 Dillington, Cambridgeshire, a hamlet neat Great Staughton
 Dillington, Somerset, a hamlet near Ilminster
 Dillington House, a hotel and college

People 
Dillington baronets
Robert Dillington (disambiguation)